Habib Thiam (21 January 1933 – 26 June 2017) was a Senegalese politician. He served as Prime Minister of Senegal on two occasions, from 1 January 1981 to 3 April 1983, and again from 8 April 1991 until 3 July 1998.

He also served as President of the National Assembly from 1983 to 1984.

Family 
He was married to Anne Majken née Hessner, a native of Denmark and former member of the Danish parliament for the Social Democratic Party. They have two daughters.

References

External links
National Assembly profile 

1933 births
2017 deaths
Prime Ministers of Senegal
Presidents of the National Assembly (Senegal)
Socialist Party of Senegal politicians
Senegalese male sprinters
French male sprinters
People from Dakar
Knights Commander of the Order of Merit of the Federal Republic of Germany